The 2014 Philippine Basketball Association (PBA) Commissioner's Cup, also known as the 2014 PLDT Home TVolution-PBA Commissioner's Cup for sponsorship reasons, was the second conference of the 2013–14 PBA season. The tournament started on March 5, 2014 and finished on  May 15, 2014. The tournament allows teams to hire foreign players or imports with a height limit of 6'11" for the bottom two of the last conference, and a limit of 6'9" for other teams.

Format
The following format was observed for the duration of the conference:
 Single-round robin eliminations; 9 games per team; Teams are then seeded by basis on win–loss records.
Top eight teams will advance to the quarterfinals. In case of tie, playoffs will be held only for the #2 and #8 seeds.
Quarterfinals:
QF1: #1 seed vs #8 seed (#1 seed twice-to-beat)
QF2: #2 seed vs #7 seed (#2 seed twice-to-beat)
QF3: #3 seed vs #6 seed (best-of-3 series)
QF4: #4 seed vs #5 seed (best-of-3 series)
Semifinals (best-of-5 series):
SF1: QF1 vs. QF4 winners
SF2: QF2 vs. QF3 winners
Finals (best-of-5 series)
Winners of the semifinals

Elimination round

Team standings

Schedule

Results

Bracket

Quarterfinals

(1) Talk 'N Text vs. (8) Barangay Ginebra

(2) San Miguel vs. (7) Air21

(3) Alaska vs. (6) San Mig Super Coffee

(4) Rain or Shine vs. (5) Meralco

Semifinals

(1) Talk 'N Text vs. (4) Rain or Shine

(6) San Mig Super Coffee vs. (7) Air21

Finals

Awards

Conference
Best Player of the Conference: Jayson Castro (Talk 'N Text Tropang Texters)
Best Import of the Conference: Richard Howell (Talk 'N Text Tropang Texters)
Finals MVP: James Yap (San Mig Super Coffee Mixers)

Players of the Week

Imports 
The following is the list of imports, which had played for their respective teams at least once, with the returning imports in italics. Highlighted are the imports who stayed with their respective teams for the whole conference.

References

External links
 PBA.ph

PBA Commissioner's Cup
Commissioner's Cup